The 1956 Titleholders Championship was contested from March 8–11 at Augusta Country Club. It was the 17th edition of the Titleholders Championship.

This event was won by Louise Suggs.

Final leaderboard

External links
Star-News source

Titleholders Championship
Golf in Georgia (U.S. state)
Titleholders Championship
Titleholders Championship
Titleholders Championship
Titleholders Championship
Women's sports in Georgia (U.S. state)